This is a list of notable people and alumni associated with Etobicoke School of the Arts.

Acting 
Brittany Allen, actress, All My Children
 Ella Ballentine, actress Standoff, The Monster, L.M. Montgomery's Anne of Green Gables, Black Conflux, 
 Devon Bostick, actor, Adoration, Diary of a Wimpy Kid, The 100, Saw VI
Nazneen Contractor, actress, The Border, 24
Robin Dunne, actor, Sanctuary
Neil Hope, actor, Degrassi Junior High and Degrassi High
Kate Kelton, actress, Harold and Kumar go to White Castle, Haven
Mike Lobel, regular on Degrassi: The Next Generation
Hannah Lochner, actress, Dawn of the Dead, Wingin' It
Marnie McPhail, actress in The Edison Twins and Stir of Echoes: The Homecoming
Ramona Milano, actress in Due South and Degrassi: The Next Generation
Phillip Nozuka, actor, appeared on Degrassi: The Next Generation
Aislinn Paul, actress, Degrassi
Sebastian Pigott, actor, Being Erica, Saw 3D
Keanu Reeves, actor (expelled from ESA)
Noah Reid, actor, Schitt's Creek, Franklin
Chloe Rose, actress, Degrassi: The Next Generation
Michael Seater, actor, Life with Derek, and director, Sadie's Last Days on Earth, People Hold On
Amanda Stepto, actress, Degrassi Junior High, Degrassi High, and Degrassi: The Next GenerationMichael Therriault, theatre actor
Sophie Traub, actress, Daltry Calhoun, The Interpreter, Tenderness 
Asia Vieira, actress, Omen IV: The Awakening, The Adventures of Dudley the DragonTim Blair, actor, comedian, TallBoyz''

Visual arts and culture 
 Kara Stone, video game designer and artist
 Scott Treleaven, artist and filmmaker
 Brooke Lynn Hytes, drag queen and host of Canada's Drag Race
 Syrus Marcus Ware, artist, activist and scholar. Co-founder of Black Lives Matter - Canada

Film 
 Chris Di Staulo, film director
 Daniel Roher, film director and Oscar winner

Literature 
Ibi Kaslik, author

Music 
Adrian Anantawan, violinist
Allie X, singer
Taylor Brook, award-winning composer, musician
Marlon Chaplin, multi-instrumentalist musician, singer-songwriter
Kevin Drew, member of the band Broken Social Scene
Andre Ethier, musician/songwriter, formerly of The Deadly Snakes
Emily Haines, lead singer of Metric
Barbara Hannigan, soprano and conductor
Lisa Lougheed, recording artist and session singer
Amy Millan, singer and guitarist in Stars
Taylor Mitchell (1990–2009), country folk singer
George Nozuka, R&B singer, has toured with Backstreet Boys
Justin Nozuka, Juno Award-nominated singer-songwriter
Rob Wells, multi-platinum music producer and songwriter

Politics 
 Suze Morrison, Member of Provincial Parliament of Ontario for Toronto Centre

References 

Etobicoke School of the Arts